KHHM (101.9 MHz) is a commercial FM radio station licensed to Shingle Springs, California, and serving the Sacramento metropolitan area. It is owned by Entravision Communications and airs a Bilingual Rhythmic CHR radio format branded as "Fuego 101.9". KHHM, along with sister stations KNTY, KRCX-FM, and KXSE have their radio studios and offices on Auburn Blvd in Sacramento.

KHHM has an effective radiated power (ERP) of 47,000 watts. The transmitter is in Coloma, California, about 30 miles northeast of Sacramento. Although KHHM is licensed for HD Radio, it has yet to sign on a HD2 or HD3 digital subchannel.

History

Christian contemporary and smooth jazz
In 1989, the station signed on with a Contemporary Christian music format. Its call sign was KLIQ, better known as Q-102. Its sister station was KFIA, owned by Olympic Broadcasting. In September 1991, it simulcast with KFIA except during drive times and on the weekend when it aired Christian music. Its call sign was changed to KFIA-FM.

In October 1993, the station switched to a smooth jazz format and the call sign changed to KSSJ. By 2000, KSSJ flipped to oldies (as Cool 101.9 under the KCCL-FM calls) after KHYL dropped the format for Rhythmic Oldies. The call sign was changed to KNTY on July 19, 2006.

Regional Mexican
On July 2, 2019, staffers at KNTY and its Columbia-Modesto simulcast KCVR-FM, along with sister KHHM, informed listeners that they have been let go. Both stations were to flip formats on July 8, 2019, with KNTY to take a Regional Mexican presentation. The news ended a 13-year run with Country for "101.9 The Wolf," and a short 4-month run for "98.9 The Wolf."

On July 8, 2019, KNTY changed its format from country to a simulcast of Regional Mexican-formatted KRCX-FM 99.9 Marysville, branded as "La Tricolor".

On January 7, 2020, KNTY split from its simulcast with KRCX-FM and launched a Ranchera music format, branded as "José 101.9".

Fuego bilingual CHR
As part of a shuffle of formats, frequencies and call letters in Entravision's Sacramento cluster, on July 20, 2021, KNTY dropped the ranchera format and "José" branding, and began simulcasting the "Fuego" bilingual top 40 format, which was heard on KHHM (103.5 FM).

"Fuego" moved exclusively to 101.9 FM on August 2. At that time, the KHHM call letters moved to the 101.9 facility. Simultaneously, 103.5 relaunched as classic country-formatted KNTY.

References

External links

HHM
Radio stations established in 1990
Entravision Communications stations
HHM
Rhythmic contemporary radio stations in the United States
1990 establishments in California